Ayatollah Abdul Nabi Namazi  (born: 1945, Bushehr) is an Iranian Twelver Shia cleric and politician. He was a member of the 3rd Assembly of Experts of the Islamic Republic of Iran who won re-election for the 4th and 5th Assemblies.

He was formerly the prosecutor-general for the judiciary of the Islamic Republic and received some notoriety in 2002 when he was criticized by the conservative newspaper Jumhuri Eslami, for "flagrantly" ignoring Supreme Leaders Ali Khamenei's order to review a death sentence handed down to Hashem Aghajari for apostasy for a speech he gave on Islam urging Iranians to "not blindly follow" Islamic clerics...

See also
2006 Iranian Assembly of Experts election
List of Ayatollahs
Prosecutor-General of Iran
List of members in the Second Term of the Council of Experts
List of members in the Third Term of the Council of Experts
List of members in the Fourth Term of the Council of Experts
List of members in the Fifth Term of the Council of Experts

References and notes

External links
AHMAD BATEBI’S ABDUCTION CONFIRMED
Iran to take legal action with Iraqi court against Saddam soon

Iranian ayatollahs
20th-century Iranian judges
Iranian Islamists
Shia Islamists
Living people
Members of the Assembly of Experts
1945 births
Society of Seminary Teachers of Qom members
People from Bushehr
21st-century Iranian judges